"Hurry Sundown" is a song written by Keith Stegall, Denny Henson and Brent Mason, and recorded by American country music group McBride & the Ride.  It was released in July 1993 as the second single and title track from the album Hurry Sundown. The song reached No. 17 on the U.S. Billboard Hot Country Singles & Tracks chart and peaked at No. 8 on the RPM Country Tracks in Canada.

Content
The song is about a loving, working-class couple who look forward to "sundown" so they can enjoy other and forget about the stresses of the day.

Music video
The music video was directed by Wayne Miller and premiered in July 1993.

Chart performance
"Hurry Sundown" debuted at number 59 on the U.S. Billboard Hot Country Singles & Tracks chart for the week of July 31, 1993.

References

1993 singles
McBride & the Ride songs
Songs written by Keith Stegall
Song recordings produced by Tony Brown (record producer)
MCA Records singles
1993 songs
Songs written by Brent Mason